Soviet kobzars were stylised performers on the bandura created to replace the traditional authentic kobzari who had been wiped out in the 1930s. These performers were often blind and although some actually had contact with the authentic kobzari of the previous generation, many received formal training in the Folk conservatories by trained musicians and played on contemporary chromatic concert factory made instruments. 

Their repertoire was primarily made up of censored versions of traditional kobzar repertoire and focused on stylized works that praised the Soviet system and Soviet heroes. Most of this music lost its traditional folk characteristics such as modal tunings, traditional folk melodic embellishments, playing style etc.

The group includes performers such as Yevhen Adamtsevych, Petro Huz', and Yehor Movchan.

See also 
 Persecuted bandurists

References 

Soviet culture
Kobzarstvo
Ukrainian folk music